Donald William "Donnie" Hasenohrl (born November 25, 1935) is a retired American politician and union steelworker.  He was a member of the Wisconsin State Assembly for 26 years, representing his hometown, Marshfield, Wisconsin, and surrounding areas.

Early life and career
Hasenohrl was born in Marshfield, Wisconsin, and graduated from Marshfield High School.  Hasenohrl worked as a farmer in his youth and was employed by the Marshfield Fire Department as a firefighter in 1960 and 1961.  He went on to work as a steel fabricator at the Felker Brothers Manufacturing Company in Marshfield until his election to the Assembly; he was a member of the local Boilermakers union and a delegate to the Marshfield Central Labor Council.

Political career
As a young man, Hasenohrl became involved with the Democratic Party of Wisconsin and founded the Marshfield Young Democrats.  He served as a field staffer for William Proxmire during his successful United States Senate campaigns in 1957 and 1958.

He made his first attempt at elected office in 1962, running for Wood County register of deeds against incumbent Robert J. Ryan, but Hasenohrl fell far short of his Republican opponent in the November general election.  Nevertheless, a month later, in December 1962, he was elected chairman of the Wood County Democratic Party for 1963. He was subsequently reelected to another year as chairman in January 1964. He ran again for county office in 1964, running for county clerk; he was again defeated by the Republican incumbent.

After 1964, Hasenohrl stepped back from his attempts to seek office, but remained invested in local affairs and state politics.  He became more involved with local labor organizations and was appointed to the Marshfield City Plan Commission.  He and his wife continued to campaign in support of Democrats in the state, such as then-assemblymember Dave Obey and U.S. Senator Gaylord Nelson.

In 1974, a decade after his last election, he once again sought higher office.  He announced a run for Wisconsin State Assembly in the 70th assembly district seat, which was being vacated by the incumbent John Oestreicher.  At the time, the district comprised eastern Clark County, southern Marathon County, northeast Portage County, and northern Wood County.  Several Democrats expressed interest in running for the now-open seat, but ultimately Hasenohrl faced only two opponents in the Democratic primary—Arlen K. Wanta, town chairman of Rudolph, Wisconsin, and Thomas F. Stockheimer, a supporter of the American Party who believed he'd have a better chance as a Democrat.  Hasenohrl prevailed in the September primary with 57% of the vote.  The November general election in the 70th assembly district produced the closest outcome in the state; Hasenohrl won the seat by a mere 42 votes.

Hasenohrl won reelection in 1976 by a wide margin, helped by a national Democratic wave against the Nixon-Ford years, but faced another difficult contest in 1978, winning by just 581 votes.  Following 1978, Hasenohrl won comfortable reelection victories in 1980, 1982, 1984, and 1990, and was unopposed in 1986, 1988, and 1992.

Following close reelection contests in 1994 and 1998, Hasenohrl announced he would not seek a 14th term in 2000.

Hasenohrl served for several years on the committees on highways and transportation, serving as chairman of the transportation committee from 1983 through 1993; he also served for several sessions on the committees on rural development, rural affairs, and forestry.  Hasenohrl enthusiastically supported his former legislative aide, Julie Lassa, when she ran for State Assembly in the neighboring 71st assembly district in 1998, and later when she ran for Wisconsin State Senate.

Personal life and family
Donald Hasenohrl married Kathleen J. Stashek on May 13, 1961, in Wisconsin Rapids.  His wife was a registered nurse and a teacher at Mid-State Technical College.  They had three children, all of whom are now grown, and still reside in Pittsville, Wisconsin, just south of Marshfield.

Hasenohrl has been a member of the Fraternal Order of Eagles, the Benevolent and Protective Order of Elks, the Knights of Columbus, and was member and director of the Wisconsin State Fair Association.

Electoral history

Wood County Register of Deeds (1962)

| colspan="6" style="text-align:center;background-color: #e9e9e9;"| General Election, November 6, 1962

Wood County Clerk (1964)

| colspan="6" style="text-align:center;background-color: #e9e9e9;"| General Election, November 3, 1964

Wisconsin Assembly (1974–1998)

References

External links
 

People from Marshfield, Wisconsin
Democratic Party members of the Wisconsin State Assembly
1935 births
Living people
American boilermakers